Morg is a fictional supervillain appearing in American comic books published by Marvel Comics. The character is usually depicted as a herald of Galactus. He was created by Ron Lim and Ron Marz and first appeared in Silver Surfer (vol. 3) #69 (August 1992).

Fictional character biography

Origin
Morg served as a herald of Galactus after Galactus' previous herald, Nova, was expelled for sparing suitable but inhabited planets from his hunger. Subsequently, prior to consuming his latest planet, Galactus was confronted by Morg, a court executioner who had betrayed his own race by executing his own people for those that had defeated them. In the presence of the world-devourer, Morg showed no fear; instead exhibiting a respectful defiance. Impressed with Morg's demeanor and wary after losing several heralds to attacks of conscience, Galactus decided to employ this most brutal and remorseless specimen as his latest herald.

Morg gladly accepted the task of being Galactus' herald. As a weapon, Morg wields a double-edged battle axe—previously used by him in his executioner duties.

Galactus' herald
One of Galactus' former heralds, the Silver Surfer, went to meet Nova but instead found out that she had been dismissed and replaced by Morg. After informing the Surfer of this, Galactus told the Surfer to leave; however, the Surfer refused to leave without seeing Nova, resulting in a battle with Morg. After fighting Morg and noticing his heartlessness, the Surfer decided to go find Nova and the rest of Galactus's former heralds and have them join him in another battle against Morg.

While seeking reinforcements, the heralds found by the Silver Surfer included Firelord, Nova, Terrax and Air-Walker, whom they had to unearth from his grave and reassemble. During this time, Morg discovered a Well on a planet to which he had led Galactus, and in this well were waters containing "mystical power". Morg immersed himself in the pool, which enhanced his powers exponentially before he returned to his master and destroyed the planet.

The assembled heralds confronted Morg together, and Terrax used the fact that they were not able to defeat him to convince the Surfer to instead try to get help from Galactus. While the Surfer was gone, Air-Walker was severely damaged again and Morg killed Nova by blasting her in the back when he was thought to have been beaten. Galactus was not pleased with this, so he removed the Power Cosmic that he had imbued in Morg, leaving him with only the power he had gained from the pool he had discovered. In his weakened state, Morg was killed by Terrax. After the battle both Firelord and Air Walker volunteered to work for Galactus in order to gain access to Galactus' technology.

Months later, Galactus resurrected Morg to give him a second chance. Morg then sought his missing axe. Morg went off in search of Terrax to exact vengeance upon him, but in their battle they were ambushed by robots working for the villain Tyrant and were taken captive.

While his fellow captives Silver Surfer, Gladiator, Beta Ray Bill, Jack of Hearts and Ganymede fought back against Tyrant, Morg chose to continue his battle with Terrax, heedless of the threat posed by Tyrant. Tyrant easily defeated his opposition, although the appearance of Galactus disrupted the battle. Morg had been incapacitated in the battle, like all those involved, save for the Surfer. Tyrant stated that everyone there could go free, except for Morg, for no other reason than to spite the world devourer.

Tyrant imprisoned Morg and continued to siphon off his Power Cosmic and store it into his orbs. Eventually Morg escaped and went back to his master Galactus, and served as herald again for a brief time. In a battle between Galactus and Tyrant, Morg found the Ultimate Nullifier and used it to melt most of Tyrant's body then betrayed both masters by cutting off his own arm while he tried to escape the final nullification blast (Tyrant's drone attached itself to the Nullifier and Morg's arm thus not allowing Morg to separate himself from the Nullifier). His escape failed and the Nullifier exploded, destroying Galactus' ship and all aboard.

Annihilus later attempts to retrieve the Power Cosmic from Morg's corpse, but fails.

Eventually, Morg returned to life through unrevealed means. When the alien conquerors known as the Reckoning threatened the life of Eternity with their universe-spanning war, Morg joined with the other heralds of Galactus in an assault on Asgard in an effort to resurrect their former master so he could join the fight and save Eternity. Morg and the other heralds then joined an alliance of different alien civilizations to fight off the Reckoning.

Powers and abilities
Morg was imbued with the Power Cosmic by Galactus, as he did with all his heralds. The physical transformation by the cosmic power of Galactus allowed Morg to fly through space and granted him exponentially enhanced superhuman strength, speed, stamina, durability, agility, and reflexes. Morg can manipulate cosmic energy for various effects, including the projection of energy bolts of cosmic force, the augmentation of his strength to even greater superhuman levels, and survive unprotected in the vacuum of outer space without the need of oxygen, food or sleep. Morg carried a  double-bladed cosmic axe with a  handle, able to emanate waves of destructive force sufficiently powerful to rend a tear in Galactus's ship and to create highly impervious force shields. The mystical pool, the Well of Life, that Morg immersed himself in augmented each of these abilities further, making him more powerful than any other single herald, even more so than the Silver Surfer. It is unknown whether this still holds true after the events of Annihilation Wave, when Silver Surfer was empowered further by Galactus.

Morg was also an experienced fighter and executioner.

In other media

Television 
Morg was to have appeared in the second season of the Silver Surfer animated series. His appearance was in the episode "Soul Hunter, Part 1". The Silver Surfer had to save The Universal Library from Morg and Thiran. Both are part of a race called the Sargs.

Toys 
A Morg Minimate will be featured in the Toys "R" Us exclusive Heralds of Galactus boxset.

A Marvel Legends figure of Morg is included with the HasLab Marvel Legends figure of Galactus. The figure also comes with his axe.

References

External links

Grand Comics Database's entry on the issue of Silver Surfer containing Morg's debut

Comics characters introduced in 1992
Fictional axefighters
Fictional characters with superhuman durability or invulnerability
Fictional executioners
Marvel Comics aliens
Marvel Comics characters who can move at superhuman speeds
Marvel Comics characters with superhuman strength
Marvel Comics extraterrestrial supervillains
Marvel Comics supervillains